Francisco Alfredo Martínez (born 4 June 1990) is an Argentine professional footballer who plays as a left-back or centre-back for Flandria.

Career
Martínez played in the academy of Los Cuervos del Fin del Mundo. All Boys were Martínez's first senior club. He made his professional debut on 6 August 2011 during an Argentine Primera División draw with Belgrano. Ahead of 2013–14, with Martínez having made twenty-six appearances for All Boys, he made a move to fellow top-flight side Atlético de Rafaela. He was selected in four fixtures in 2013–14. On 2 July 2014, Martínez signed for Douglas Haig of Primera B Nacional. He netted his first professional goal after fifteen games in the following November versus Guaraní Antonio Franco as they lost 3–1 in Posadas.

He remained with the club for 2014 and 2015, featuring a total of fifty-eight times along with two goals. In January 2016, Martínez agreed to sign for fellow second tier team Los Andes. Two goals in forty-four matches subsequently occurred for Los Andes across two seasons. Martínez joined Flandria for ten months from September 2017 to June 2018, when the defender completed a move to Defensores de Belgrano.

Career statistics
.

References

External links

1990 births
Living people
People from Ushuaia
Argentine footballers
Association football defenders
Argentine Primera División players
Primera Nacional players
All Boys footballers
Atlético de Rafaela footballers
Club Atlético Douglas Haig players
Club Atlético Los Andes footballers
Flandria footballers
Defensores de Belgrano footballers
CSyD Tristán Suárez footballers